Roy Kenneth Frazier (June 6, 1942 – November 14, 2002) was an American football player and coach. He served as the head football coach at East Tennessee State University in Johnson City, Tennessee from 1973 to 1977, compiling a record of 16–36–2.

Head coaching record

References

1942 births
2002 deaths
East Tennessee State Buccaneers football coaches
Vanderbilt Commodores football coaches
Vanderbilt Commodores football players